Oscar Ramsay (born 22 May 1997) is a New Zealand professional footballer who plays as a midfielder for New Zealand club North Shore United in the Northern League.

Club career
Born in Auckland, Ramsay began playing organized football at the age of five for the youth teams at Western Springs. He played a few years at Western Springs before joining Joga Bonita and Wynrs Wynton Rufer Academy. Ramsay then went on to play for Central United and youth team at Auckland City before moving to the United States.

In 2016, Ramsay enrolled at Hofstra University and joined the Hofstra Pride soccer team. During his four seasons at Hofstra, Ramsay played 73 matches and scored six goals. While at Hofstra, Ramsay played for GPS Portland Phoenix, Reading United and Lionsbridge in the USL League Two in 2017, 2018 and 2019 respectively. At Portland, Ramsay made 13 appearances and tallied 5 assists. With Reading United, Ramsay played in six matches without scoring a goal. At Lionsbridge, Ramsay played in five matches and scored one goal on 6 July 2019 against North Carolina Fusion U23.

After leaving Hofstra, Ramsay signed with USL Championship side Charlotte Independence. He made his professional debut for the club on 23 August 2020 against Miami. He came on as an 84th-minute substitute for Jake Areman as Charlotte were defeated 2–1.

International career
Ramsay has represented New Zealand at the under-20 level.

Career statistics

Club

References

External links
Profile at the Hofstra Pride website
Profile at the Charlotte Independence website

1997 births
Living people
People from Auckland
New Zealand association footballers
Association football midfielders
Hofstra Pride men's soccer players
GPS Portland Phoenix players
Reading United A.C. players
Lionsbridge FC players
Charlotte Independence players
North Shore United AFC players
USL League Two players
USL Championship players
Association footballers from Auckland
New Zealand expatriate sportspeople in the United States
Expatriate soccer players in the United States
New Zealand expatriate association footballers